The Emergency Management Interim Legislative Succession Act (63 O.S. Sections 688.1 - 688.14) is an Oklahoma state law governing emergency succession to the all offices members of the Oklahoma Legislature. The similar Act governing the members of the state and local governments is the Oklahoma Emergency Interim Executive and Judicial Succession Act.

The Emergency Legislative Succession Act was signed into law by Governor Brad Henry on August 29, 2003.

In General
Each legislator must designate no less than three and no more than seven Emergency Interim Successors to his powers and duties and specify their order of succession. Each house of the Legislature, in accordance with its own rules, determines who is entitled under the provisions of the Emergency Legislative Succession Act to exercise the powers and assume the duties of its members. When an Emergency Interim Successor exercises the powers and assumes the duties of a legislator, the Successor is accorded the privileges and immunities, compensation, allowances and other perquisites of office to which a legislator is entitled.

See also
Oklahoma Legislature
Oklahoma Emergency Management Act of 2003
Oklahoma Emergency Response Act
Catastrophic Health Emergency Powers Act
Oklahoma Emergency Interim Executive and Judicial Succession Act

Emergency
2003 in American law
2003 in Oklahoma